The 2017 Filoil Flying V Preseason Premier Cup is the twelfth preseason high school and collegiate basketball tournament organized by Filoil Flying V Sports.

This is only year that the cup was not televised after its former broadcast partner ABS-CBN Sports parted ways with the tournament organizers Filoil Flying V Sports at the end of the last year's edition of the tournament; the television broadcast of the tournament will officially returned to ESPN 5 in the following year.

Teams

Seniors' Division

Juniors' Division

Tournament format 
Due to different number of groups in men's and juniors' division, each has its own competition format.

Men's division 
The tournament format for men's division are as follows:
 During elimination round, teams will only play against teams in their group in a single round-robin schedule.
 At the end of the eliminations, the top four teams in each group will advance to the quarterfinal round.
 At the quarterfinals:
 Seeds #1 in group A meets #4 of group B (QF1)
 Seeds #2 in group B meets #3 of group A (QF2)
 Seeds #1 in group B meets #4 of group A (QF3)
 Seeds #2 in group A meets #3 of group B (QF4)
 Winner of QF1 meets winner of QF2 while QF3 winner meets QF4 winner in the semifinals.
 Winners of the semifinals will play for the Final round, while losers will battle for third place.
 The quotient system shall be applied in case of a tie in the standings between two or more teams.
 Only one foreign player shall play at a time in the court.

Juniors' division 
The tournament format for junior's division are as follows:
 During elimination round, teams will only play against teams in their group in a single round-robin schedule.
 The top six teams in overall standings, regardless of the group, will play for the quarterfinal round. The seeds #1 and #2 teams automatically advances to the semifinals.
 At the quarterfinals, team #3 meets #6 while #4 meets #5.
 At the semifinals, winners of the playoffs between #3 and #6 will face team #1, while #2 will play against the winner between #4 and #5.
 Winners of the semifinals will play for the Final round, while losers will battle for third place.
 The quotient system shall be applied in case of a tie in the standings between two or more teams.

Men's division

Elimination round

Group A

Team standings

Schedule

Results 

Number of asterisks (*) denotes the number of overtime periods.

Group B

Team standings

Schedule

Results 

Number of asterisks (*) denotes the number of overtime periods.

Bracket

Quarterfinals 
All times are local (UTC+8).

Semifinals 
All times are local (UTC+8).

Battle for Third 
All times are local (UTC+8).

Final
All times are local (UTC+8).

Juniors' division

Elimination round

Group A

Team standings 

Source: Philsports.ph

Schedule

Results 

Number of asterisks (*) denotes the number of overtime periods.

Group B

Team standings

Schedule

Results 

Number of asterisks (*) denotes the number of overtime periods.

Bracket

Semifinals 
All times are local (UTC+8).

Battle for Third 
All times are local (UTC+8).

Final 
All times are local (UTC+8).

References

External links 
 

Filoil Flying V Preseason Premier Cup
2017 in Philippine sport